Lee Gang-seok (born 23 May 1967) is a South Korean boxer. He competed in the men's lightweight event at the 1988 Summer Olympics.

References

1967 births
Living people
People from Gyeonggi Province
Sportspeople from Gyeonggi Province
People from Uijeongbu
South Korean male boxers
Olympic boxers of South Korea
Boxers at the 1988 Summer Olympics
Place of birth missing (living people)
Lightweight boxers